Ravat is a village in Batken Region of Kyrgyzstan. It is part of the Batken District. Its population was 2,658 in 2021.

A nearby village is Katrang (9 miles).

References

External links 
 Satellite map at Maplandia.com

Populated places in Batken Region